In Greek mythology, the name Phaenops (Ancient Greek: Φαίνοπος) refers to three characters who are all associated with Troy and the Trojan War:

 Phaenops, father of Xanthus and Thoon, who were slain by Diomedes. He was an old man by the time the Trojan War began, and had no other sons and heirs except these two.
 Phaenops, father of Phorcys, from Phrygia.
 Phaenops, son of Asius, grandson of Dymas and brother of Adamas. He was a resident of Abydus and the best guest-friend of Hector. Apollo, at one point, assumed the form of this Phaenops to appear in front of Hector.

Notes

References 

 Homer, The Iliad with an English Translation by A.T. Murray, Ph.D. in two volumes. Cambridge, MA., Harvard University Press; London, William Heinemann, Ltd. 1924. . Online version at the Perseus Digital Library.
 Homer, Homeri Opera in five volumes. Oxford, Oxford University Press. 1920. . Greek text available at the Perseus Digital Library.

Trojans
People of the Trojan War